The Codex Style is one of the most celebrated and most recognizable styles of Ancient Maya art. It was first identified in 1973 by Michael Coe in the book: The Maya Scribe and His World (Coe 1973), in which the PSS (Primary Standard Sequence) was discovered. Coe called it “codex style” because he believed that the authors of the designs on the vessels were the same scribes who had painted or written the codices (Coe 1973: 13; 1994: 209–210) and that the paintings on the vessels imitated images of the Maya codices. The definition was later taken up by Robicsek and Hales in The Maya Book of Dead (Robicsek and Hales 1981), in a book, the title of which reveals the assumption that the vases could deal with subjects such as the Book of the Dead of the Ancient Egyptians and Underworld themes. Next, after different hypotheses about the origin of these ceramic typologies, after the discovery of the Codex Scribe Vessel 1 and of “codex” style fragments Nakbe (Hansen et al. 1991; 1992; Forsyth 1993) it was thought that these vessels were produced by several workshops in the north-eastern Petén, namely the areas of Nakbe and El Mirador. Recent studies and findings have shown that they also occurred in Calakmul (Delvendahl 2008; García Barrios 2011; Boucher and Palomo 2012).

Description of the Style
The Codex Style, as the name already clarifies, has a strong resemblance to the surviving Postclassic Maya codices. Comparing the scenes painted in the corpus of the vases in this style, the contrast of the black line on a white (or cream) background with the addition of a hieroglyphic caption illustrating the iconography all of these artistic devices recalled the uses of color and space in the Dresden Codex and the other three Postclassic handwritings.

References 

 Boucher, Sylviane, and Yoly Palomo, Discriminación visual como determinante de estilo y asignación tipológica de la cerámica códice de Calakmul, Campeche. Estudios de cultura maya 39: 99–132 2012.
 Coe, Michael D., The Maya Scribe and His World. New York: The Grolier Club 1973.
 Coe, Michael D., Lords of the Underworld; Masterpieces of Classic Maya Ceramics. New Jersey: Princeton University Press 1978.
 Coe, Michael D., and Justin Kerr, The Art of the Maya Scribe. Thames and Hudson 1997.
 Delvendahl, Kai, Calakmul in Sight: History and Archaeology of an Ancient Maya City. Unas Letras
Industria Editorial 2008.
 Robicsek, Francis, and Donald Hales, The Maya Book of the Dead: The Corpus of Codex Style Ceramics of the Late Classic period. Norman: University of Oklahoma Press 1981.

Maya Classic Period